The Mayor of Fort Lauderdale serves a three-year term, no greater than six consecutive terms, for a maximum of eighteen years.

Mayor-Council Government (1912–1925)
Mayor was appointed from the Council.
 1912–1913 W.H. Marshall
 1913–1914 George G. Mathews Jr.
 1914–1915 Dr. C.G. Holland
 1916–1918 Will J. Reed
 1918 James S. Richard
 1918–1919 Will J. Reed
 1919–1923 C.E. Farrington
 1922–1924 R. G. Snow
 1924–1925 Will J. Reed

Mayor-Commission Government (1925–1982)
Mayor was appointed from the Commission for a two-year term
 1925–1927 J.W. Tidball
 1927–1929 C.D. Kittridge
 1929–1931 T.E. Haskins
 1931–1933 J.W. Needham
 1933–1934 E.A. Pychon (resigned 1934)
 1934–1935 M.A. Hortt
 1935–1937 Lewis E. Moore
 1937–1939 Thomas B. Manuel
 1939–1941 Lewis E. Moore
 1941–1942 H. L. McCann (resigned 1942)
 1942–1943 N.B. Cheaney
 1943–1945 Joe N. Morris 
 1945–1947 H.C.Holden
 1947–1949 Reed A. Bryan
 1949–1951 F.R. Humphries
 1951–1953 Lewis E. Moore (resigned 1953)
 1953–1955 C. Malcolm Carlisle
 1955–1957 Porter G. Reynolds
 1957–1960 John V. Russell (resigned 1960)
 1960–1961 Edward H. Johns
 1961–1963 Edmund R. Burry
 1963–1965 Melvin R. "Cy" Young
 1965–1969 Edmund R. Burry
 1969–1971 F. Peter Clements
 1971–1973 James L. Leavitt
 1973–1975 Virginia S. Young
 1975–1981 E. Clay Shaw, Jr.
 1981–1982 Virginia S. Young

Mayor-Commission Government (1982 - present)
Mayor is elected in citywide race, serving a maximum of 6 terms, each consisting of 3 years.
 1982–1986 Robert A. Dressler
 1986–1991 Robert O. "Bob" Cox
 1991–2009 James T. "Jim" Naugle
 2009–2018 John P. "Jack" Seiler
 2018–present Dean Trantalis

See also
 Timeline of Fort Lauderdale, Florida

References

Fort Lauderdale

History of Fort Lauderdale, Florida